HD 26670, also known as HR 1305, is a star located in the northern circumpolar constellation of Camelopardalis, the giraffe. The object has been designated as 26 H. Camelopardalis, but is not commonly used in modern times. It has an apparent magnitude of 5.70, allowing it to be faintly visible to the naked eye. Based on parallax measurements from Gaia DR3, the object is estimated to be 491 light years away from the Solar System.

Characteristics
This is a solitary, bluish-white hued B-type main-sequence star with a stellar classification of B7 V. It has also been given a class of B5 Vn with the addition of broad or nebulous absorption lines due to rapid rotation. It has 4 times the mass of the Sun and is estimated to be 57 million years old, having completed only a quarter of its main sequence lifetime. When combined, these parameters yield a luminosity 244 times greater than the Sun's from its photosphere. Huang et al. As a result, the surface gravity is greater at the poles rather than the equator and it has an oblate shape.

Notes

References

B-type main-sequence stars
026670
Camelopardalis (constellation)
019968
1305
BD+61 00387